The Bigben supercomputer  was a Cray XT3 MPP system with 2068 nodes located at Pittsburgh Supercomputing Center.  It was decommissioned on March 31, 2010. Bigben was a part of the TeraGrid.

System architecture 

BigBen was a Cray XT3 MPP system with 2068 compute nodes linked by a custom-designed interconnect.  Twenty-two dedicated IO processors were also connected to this network. Each compute node had two 2.6 GHz AMD Opteron processors. Each compute processor had its own cache, but the two processors on a node shared 2 GB of memory and the network connection.

Operating system 
Bigben ran Catamount, a subset of Unix.

File system 

Bigben had two file systems comprising together over 199 TB of storage space.

Compilers 

Bigben had the Portland Group, the Gnu, and UPC compilers installed.

See also 

TeraGrid
National Science Foundation
Pittsburgh Supercomputing Center

External links 

Pittsburgh Supercomputing Center
Teragrid
National Science Foundation

Cray products
X86 supercomputers